K. P. P. Baskar is an Indian politician and incumbent member of the 15th Tamil Nadu Legislative Assembly from the Namakkal constituency. He was previously elected to the 14th Tamil Nadu Legislative Assembly. He represents the All India Anna Dravida Munnetra Kazhagam party.

References 

All India Anna Dravida Munnetra Kazhagam politicians
Living people
Year of birth missing (living people)
Tamil Nadu MLAs 2011–2016
Tamil Nadu MLAs 2016–2021
Tamil Nadu politicians